The Worthing series is a series of science fiction works by American writer Orson Scott Card.  It consists of two anthologies and two novels.  The first three books in this series are currently out of print.

Books in the series
Capitol (1979) 
Hot Sleep (1979)
 The Worthing Chronicle (1983) - revised edition of Hot Sleep  
 The Worthing Saga (1990; includes The Worthing Chronicle and selected stories from Capitol)

See also

List of works by Orson Scott Card
Orson Scott Card

External links
 The official Orson Scott Card website

Book series introduced in 1979
Novels by Orson Scott Card
Science fiction book series